Tim Clark (born 1 August 1986) is a horse racing jockey. He has ridden 496 winners overall in Australia with 2010–2011 his best season to date, in which he rode 97 winners. He started his career in Hong Kong in 2011–2012. He also has a daughter and fellow jockey Raquel Clarke.

Major Wins 
 The Galaxy - Typhoon Zed (2008)
 Doncaster Handicap - Sacred Choice (2011)
 The Galaxy - Atomic Force (2011)
 All Aged Stakes - Hot Danish (2010)
 Doomben 10,000 - Hot Danish (2010}
 Underwood Stakes - Alligator Blood (2022)

Performance 

Last update: 13 Feb 2012

References

The Hong Kong Jockey Club

Hong Kong jockeys
Living people
1986 births